Parliamentary elections were held in Laos on 24 February 2002. The ruling Lao People's Revolutionary Party (LPRP) won all 109 seats in the National Assembly.

Campaign
A total of 166 candidates contested the 109 seats, of which 165 were members of the LPRP.

Results

References

Elections in Laos
Laos
2002 in Laos
One-party elections
Election and referendum articles with incomplete results